"Si Tú Supieras" ("If You Knew") is a song written by Omar Alfanno and performed by Puerto Rican salsa singer Giro for his studio album Loco de Amor (1995). It became his first number one song on the Tropical Airplay in the US. The track was recognized as one of the best-performing songs of the year at the 1996 ASCAP Latin Awards.

Charts

Year-end charts

See also
List of Billboard Tropical Airplay number ones of 1994 and 1995

References

1995 singles
1995 songs
Giro (singer) songs
Spanish-language songs